Potente is a surname. Notable people with the surname include:

Franka Potente (born 1974), German actress
Osvaldo Potente (born 1951), Argentine retired footballer